Ougarta is an oasis and a village in the commune of Béni Abbès, in Béchar Province, Algeria. Ougarta has a population of about 250 inhabitants. The village has given its name to the Ougarta Range which surrounds the village. A local road connects the village to the N6 highway near Béni Abbès.

Notes and references

Neighbouring towns and cities

Populated places in Béchar Province